John F. Kennedy (1917–1963) was the president of the United States from 1961 to 1963.

Jack Kennedy may also refer to:

Jack Kennedy (footballer, born 1873), Scottish international football player
Jack Kennedy (footballer, born 1906), English football player
Jack Kennedy (hurler), Irish forward
Jack Kennedy (jockey) (born 1999), Irish jockey
Jack Kennedy (train robber) (c. 1870–1922), American outlaw
J. Jack Kennedy Jr. (born 1956), member of the Virginia House of Delegates
Uncle Jack Kennedy (1919–2005), activist and spokesman for Australian Aboriginal rights
Kennedy (musician), full name Jack Kennedy, American nu-disco musician and former member of the Silversun Pickups

See also
John Kennedy (disambiguation)